Başak Eraydın and Lidziya Marozava were the defending champions, but chose not to participate.

Irina Khromacheva and Maryna Zanevska won the title, defeating Cornelia Lister and Nina Stojanović in the final, 4–6, 7–5, [10–8].

Seeds

Draw

References 
 Draw

Engie Open de Biarritz - Doubles